Li Shishi (born July 1953) is a Chinese politician.

Biography
Li was born in Changsha, Hunan in 1953. He graduated from English Department of Hunan Normal University in 1977, and admitted to China Foreign Affairs University, pursuing a master's degree from 1981 to 1984.

He was appointed to be the Chairman of the Legislative Affairs Commission of the Standing Committee of the National People's Congress in 2008.

Li is a member of the 18th Central Commission for Discipline Inspection.

References

External links
Profile of Li Shishi

1953 births
Politicians from Changsha
People's Republic of China politicians from Hunan
Living people